"Here's a Quarter (Call Someone Who Cares)" is a song written and recorded by American country music artist Travis Tritt. It was released in May 1991 as the lead-off single to his album It's All About to Change. It peaked at number 2 in both the United States and Canada. This is one of Tritt’s most popular songs. When he would perform the song live, members of the audience would often throw actual quarters on stage, many striking Tritt.

Content
The narrator speaks of a former significant other who regrets leaving him, and now wants to include herself in his life once again. However, the narrator no longer trusts her because of her actions.

In response, he gives her a quarter (in 1991, the common price for a local pay telephone call) and tells her to phone someone else who cares to listen.

Music video
The music video was directed by Gerry Wenner. The woman playing the role of the woman wanting the narrator of the song back is Leighanne Wallace, the future wife of Backstreet Boys member Brian Littrell.

Personnel
The following musicians play on this track:
 Sam Bacco — percussion, timpani
 Richard Bennett — electric guitar, second solo
 Mike Brignardello — bass guitar
 Larry Byrom — acoustic guitar
 John Cowan — background vocals
 Wendell Cox — electric guitar, first solo
 Terry Crisp — steel guitar
 Stuart Duncan — fiddle
 Bernie Leadon — electric guitar
 Phil Madeira — Hammond B-3 organ
 Tim Passmore — background vocals
 Matt Rollings — piano
 Jimmy Joe Ruggiere — harmonica
 Russell Smith — background vocals
 Steve Turner — drums
 Billy Joe Walker Jr. — electric guitar

Chart positions

Year-end charts

References

1991 singles
Travis Tritt songs
Songs written by Travis Tritt
Warner Records singles
1991 songs